Marco Publio Fontana (1548-1609) was an Italian humanist and poet, fellow townsman and friend of Torquato Tasso. He wrote the Apotheosis of Tasso, a poem which extended his reputation through all Italy. His most popular work is Delphinis, a Latin poem (1582).

Biography 
Marco Publio Fontana was born at Palosco, in the diocese of Brescia, in 1548. He was carefully educated by his father, Gianfrancesco, and by Pietro Rossi, receiving a most thorough training in Greek and Latin literature, especially in the poets (above all, Virgil). For mathematics, philosophy, and eventually medicine, he was sent to Brescia, but continued to study the poets, as he did after transferring his interest to theology and the Church Fathers.

The first collected edition of his Latin poems (Bergamo, 1752) runs to well over three hundred pages. The chief work is the Delphinis in three books, a mythological epic of very little but historical interest today. This is followed by five books of Heroica carmina (verse epistles, epicedia, and the like). Besides Horatian lyrics, hendecasyllabics, and a hexameter poem on the birth of Christ, there is also the Pastoralia carmina — six eclogues and three lusus pastorales.

The fifth eclogue (Doris et Alcon; 78 hexameters) is by far the least attractive, being a sentimental love-story of little verve. The sixth eclogue (Caprea, “The She-Goat”; 103 hexameters) has far more to offer. Fontana composed this pastoral elegy on the death of a friend's pet goat.

Marco Publio Fontana died on November 10, 1609. After his death the treatise Del proprio et ultimato fine del poeta was published (Bergamo 1615). His Latin poems, collected by Marco Antonio Foppa, were published with the title Poëmata omnia, by Pierantonio Serassi in Bergamo in 1752, together with a Vita di Marco Publio Fontana by cardinal Giuseppe Alessandro Furietti.

“Fontana is one of the modern poets,” says Gian Vittorio Rossi, “who have approached nearest to Virgil in beauty of imagery and harmony of diction.”

References

Bibliography 

 
 
  

17th-century Italian poets
1548 births
1609 deaths
16th-century Italian poets
16th-century male writers
Italian male poets
People from the Province of Bergamo
Italian humanists